Khonsu (also transliterated Chonsu, Khensu, Khons, Chons or Khonshu) is the ancient Egyptian god of the Moon. His name means "traveller", and this may relate to the perceived nightly travel of the Moon across the sky. Along with Thoth he marked the passage of time. Khonsu was instrumental in the creation of new life in all living creatures. At Thebes he formed part of a family triad (the "Theban Triad") with Mut as his mother and Amun his father.

Mythology 
Khonsu's name literally means "traveler" and therefore reflects the fact that the Moon (referred to as Iah in Egyptian) travels across the night sky. He was also referred to by the titles "Embracer," "Pathfinder," "Defender," and "healer," and was thought to watch over those who travel at night. As the god of light in the night, Khonsu was invoked to protect against wild animals, and aid with healing. It was said that when Khonsu caused the crescent moon to shine, women conceived, cattle became fertile, and all nostrils and every throat was filled with fresh air.

Attributes 

In art, Khonsu is typically depicted as a mummy with the symbol of childhood, a sidelock of hair, as well as the menat necklace with crook and flail. He has close links to other divine children such as Horus and Shu. He is sometimes shown wearing an eagle or falcon's head like Horus, with whom he is associated as a protector and healer, adorned with the moon disk and crescent moon.Khonsu is mentioned in the Pyramid Texts and Coffin Texts, in which he is depicted in a fierce aspect, but he does not rise to prominence until the New Kingdom, when he is described as the "Greatest God of the Great Gods". Most of the construction of the temple complex at Karnak was centered on Khonsu during the Ramesside period. The Temple of Khonsu at Karnak is in a relatively good state of preservation, and on one of the walls is depicted a creation myth in which Khonsu is described as the great snake who fertilizes the Cosmic Egg in the creation of the world.

Khonsu's reputation as a healer spread outside Egypt; a stele records how a princess of Bekhten was instantly cured of an illness upon the arrival of an image of Khonsu. King Ptolemy IV, after he was cured of an illness, called himself "Beloved of Khonsu Who Protects His Majesty and Drives Away Evil Spirits".

Locations of Khonsu's cult were Memphis, Hibis and Edfu.

In popular culture 

Khonsu appears as a character in Marvel Comics, where the spelling of his name was changed to 'Khonshu'. In the comics, the character Moon Knight is the avatar of Khonshu and is also known as "The Fist of Khonshu". Khonshu grants him supernatural abilities to fight evil in his name, but also slowly drives him insane. Moon Knight's strength, endurance, and reflexes are enhanced depending upon the phases of the moon. During Volume 2, Moon Knight is given special weapons by the cult of Khonshu. Khonshu also appears in the Marvel Cinematic Universe (MCU) television series Moon Knight, voiced by F. Murray Abraham. He is very similar to the comic version.

In the film series Night at the Museum, Khonsu is mentioned multiple times in Night at the Museum: Secret of the Tomb during the secret story behind the tablet of Ahkmenrah. In the story the golden tablet was made by the high priest in the temple of Khonsu. The tablet was made to "channel Khonsu's rays down to the tablet, rejuvenating its powers every night". The tablet has the power to bring all of the exhibits to life during the night, but if the tablet is away from "Khonsu's light [for] too long", all exhibits brought to life die.

Gallery

See also 
 List of lunar deities

References

External links 
 

 
Egyptian gods
Lunar gods
Night gods
Time and fate gods
Theban Triad
Personifications
Falcon deities